Salim Ali National Park or City Forest National Park is a national park located in Srinagar, Jammu and Kashmir, India. It covered an area of 9.07 km2. Notified in 1986, the name of the park commemorated the Indian ornithologist Salim Ali. The park was converted into the Royal Springs Golf Course, Srinagar between 1998 and 2001 by Farooq Abdullah, the then Chief Minister of Jammu & Kashmir.

His interest in Golf is very well known and encouraged him for the Golf course project next to Ecologically fragile Dal Lake. 

The park featured a wildlife species such as the hangul, musk deer, Himalayan black bear, leopard, Himalayan serow and 70 species of birds, including the paradise flycatcher, Himalayan monal, and Himalayan snowcock.

References

National parks in Jammu and Kashmir
Memorials to Salim Ali
Protected areas established in 1986
1986 establishments in Jammu and Kashmir